Gösta Carell (21 May 1888 – 23 May 1962) was a Swedish sculptor. His work was part of the sculpture event in the art competition at the 1932 Summer Olympics.

References

1888 births
1962 deaths
20th-century Swedish sculptors
Swedish male sculptors
Olympic competitors in art competitions
Artists from Stockholm